is an underground metro station located in Izumi-ku, Yokohama, Kanagawa, Japan operated by the Yokohama Municipal Subway’s Blue Line (Line 1). It is 4.8 kilometers from the terminus of the Blue Line at Shōnandai Station.

History
Nakada Station was opened on August 29, 1999. Platform screen doors were installed in September 2007.

Lines
Yokohama Municipal Subway
Blue Line

Station layout
Nakada Station has a single underground island platform, located three stories underneath an above-ground station building. The exit gates are two stories underground, and parking lot is on the first storey underground.

Platforms

References
 Harris, Ken and Clarke, Jackie. Jane's World Railways 2008-2009. Jane's Information Group (2008).

External links
 Nakada Station (Blue Line) 

Railway stations in Kanagawa Prefecture
Railway stations in Japan opened in 1999
Blue Line (Yokohama)